Mariano Fernández Gnazzo (born 27 January 1988) is an Argentine professional footballer who plays as a right back.

Career
Fernández started his career with Rivadavia, appearing twelve times for the club during 2010. 2011 saw the defender sign for Primera B Metropolitana side Villa San Carlos, remaining until the conclusion of the 2011–12 campaign whilst scoring once, versus Tristán Suárez on 31 January 2012, in fifty-one fixtures. On 30 June 2012, Fernández joined Defensa y Justicia of Primera B Nacional. Seven appearances followed over two seasons with them, prior to Fernández rejoining Villa San Carlos in July 2014. He scored goals in games against UAI Urquiza and Deportivo Armenio over fifty-three matches back with Villa San Carlos.

2016 saw Fernández sign for Guaraní Antonio Franco, which preceded a move to Agropecuario. He made thirty appearances as the club won the 2016–17 Torneo Federal A title. They were promoted to Primera B Nacional, with Fernández subsequently departing to join fellow second tier outfit Gimnasia y Esgrima on 10 August 2017. However, a year later Fernández completed a return to Agropecuario.

Career statistics
.

Honours
Agropecuario
 Torneo Federal A: 2016–17

References

External links

1988 births
Living people
Footballers from La Plata
Argentine footballers
Association football defenders
Torneo Argentino A players
Primera B Metropolitana players
Primera Nacional players
Torneo Federal A players
Rivadavia de Lincoln footballers
Club Atlético Villa San Carlos footballers
Defensa y Justicia footballers
Guaraní Antonio Franco footballers
Club Agropecuario Argentino players
Gimnasia y Esgrima de Jujuy footballers